Sanctulus of Nursia(6th century) is a priest mentioned by Pope Gregory the Great in his work called Dialogues (Dialogi de vita et miraculis patrum italicorum).

He lived during the tenure of the aforementioned pope and also passed away around the time of the writing of the same Dialogues as Gregory tells in it. He was noted for his simplicity and practical, upright faith yet at the same time being illiterate. It is said about him that by a blessing (by making the sign of the cross) he turned water to oil. This he did so when certain Lombards who were working in the olive press gave him very bad speech and scorned him when he asked for some oil. When the workers realized the miracle their scorn turned into surprise and admiration. Another time by the providence of God he was able to provide bread for 10 days for craftsmen and builders working on the restoration of the Church of St Lawrence.

Gregory later tells that he was condemned to death by beheading after he purposely let a deacon a deacon flee whom he asked to be entrusted to his care, but whom was condemned to death by the Lombards. When opposed by the deacon that he would be killed, because of this charitable act, he replied that "they can do to him only what God allows them".

His last request before the moment of the beheading, to which also all the Lombards of that district gathered to see, was to have some moments for prayer. This was granted to him, and he prayed prostrate until the executioner bid him to rise being impatient. He was heard calling on John the Apostle for help. The executioner was about to kill him, he raised his arm with the sword, but then was unable to lower it somehow, his hands became stiff in the air by a miracle of God. The Lombards in dismay recognized the sanctity of the priest and the work of God. They asked for his pardon and prayers. Sanctulus healed the arm of the executioner, but made him swear not to kill any more Christians. The Lombards at the request of Sanstulus thereafter also released all the prisoners they held captive.

Sanctulus was noted by Gregory to be an unlearned, ignorant person, more practical than theoretical in the way he fulfilled the precepts of the law:

Ignorant I am not, that this venerable man Sanctulus could scant read well, and that he knew not the precepts of the law: yet because charity is the fulfilling of the law, by loving God and his neighbour, he kept the whole law: and that which outwardly lacked in knowledge, did inwardly by charity live in his soul.

The feast day of Saint Sanctulus is observed on 15 December in the Catholic Church.

References

Italian Roman Catholic saints